The Beijing Watch is a watchmaking company located in Beijing, China. Founded in 1958, it is a producer of high-end watches, watch movements, and components.
 
In October 2016 the Shenzhen-based watch manufacturer Fiyta took over ownership of Beijing Watch.

Movements
SB18
SB20
B24

Brands
Beijing
Shuangling

See also 
 Chinese standard movement

References

External links
 (English)
FIYTA Watch Official Website

Watch manufacturing companies of China
Watch movement manufacturers
Manufacturing companies based in Beijing
Manufacturing companies established in 1958
Chinese companies established in 1958